Jim Wells County is a county  in the U.S. state of Texas. As of the 2020 census, its population was 38,891. The county was founded in 1911 and is named for James B. Wells Jr. (1850–1923), for three decades a judge and Democratic Party political boss in South Texas.

Jim Wells County comprises the Alice, Texas micropolitan statistical area, which is included in the Corpus Christi-Kingsville-Alice combined statistical area.

Geography

Major highways

  U.S. Highway 281
  Interstate 69C is currently under construction and will follow the current route of U.S. 281 in most places.
  State Highway 44
  State Highway 141
  State Highway 359
  Farm to Market Road 624
  Farm to Market Road 665
  Farm to Market Road 716
  Farm to Market Road 2295

Adjacent counties
 Live Oak County (north)
 San Patricio County (northeast)
 Nueces County (east)
 Kleberg County (east)
 Brooks County (south)
 Duval County (west)

Demographics

Note: the US Census treats Hispanic/Latino as an ethnic category. This table excludes Latinos from the racial categories and assigns them to a separate category. Hispanics/Latinos can be of any race.

At the 2000 census,  39,326 people, 12,961 households and 10,096 families were residing in the county. The population density was 46 people/sq mi (18/km2). The 14,819 housing units had an average density of 17/sq mi (7/km2).  The racial makeup of the county was 77.90% White, 0.60% African American, 0.62% Native American, 0.43% Asian,  118.83% from other races, and 2.43% from two or more races. About 75.71% of the population were Hispanics or Latinos of any race.

Of the 12,961 households, 40.2% had children under 18 living with them, 58.0% were married couples living together, 15.2% had a female householder with no husband present, and 22.1% were not families. About 19.7% of all households were made up of individuals, and 9.50% had someone living alone who was 65 or older. The average household size was 2.99, and the average family size was 3.45.

Age distribution was 31.4% under 18, 9.0% from 18 to 24, 26.5% from 25 to 44, 20.6% from 45 to 64, and 12.4% who were 65 or older. The median age was 33 years. For every 100 females, there were 95.20 males. For every 100 females aged 18 and over, there were 91.40 males.

The median household income was $28,843, and the median family income was $32,616. Males had a median income of $30,266 versus $17,190 for females. The per capita income for the county was $12,252. About 20.1% of families and 24.1% of the population were below the poverty line, including 31.8% of those under age 18 and 21.3% of those aged 65 or over.

Government and politics
Located in South Texas, Jim Wells County is part of the oldest Democratic stronghold in the entire United States, a region that has consistently voted for Democrats since the days of Woodrow Wilson. The Jim Wells County Democratic Party has maintained control of the county despite massive demographic changes due to Civil Rights, the collapse of Jim Crow and poll taxes, and mass immigration from Mexico. The only Republicans to win the county since its creation are Dwight D. Eisenhower in 1956, Richard Nixon in his 1972 landslide and Donald Trump in 2020. Since 2004, Jim Wells County has become slightly less Democratic than it was during the late twentieth century. Despite this shift, the Democratic candidate won at least 53.77 percent of the county's vote in every election from 1976 to 2020. In 2020, the county ended its streak of Democratic victories when it was won by Donald Trump with a 10% margin.

In the 2018 gubernatorial election, Republican Greg Abbott won 52.04% of the vote in Jim Wells County, becoming the first member of his party to win the county in a statewide race. During the same election, Democrat Beto O'Rourke won the county in the Senate contest with 53.85% of the vote.

1948 U.S. Senate election

Jim Wells County is known as the home of "Box 13 scandal", the infamous ballot box that gave Lyndon Baines Johnson an 87-vote edge out of 988,295 cast over popular former governor Coke Stevenson in the Democratic primary election. It was later demonstrated that 200 votes, for Johnson, were "stuffed" into the ballot box after the polls closed. Johnson went on to win the election.

Communities

Cities
 Alice (county seat)
 Orange Grove
 Premont
 San Diego (mostly in Duval County)

Village
 Pernitas Point (mostly in Live Oak County)

Census-designated places

 Alfred
 Alice Acres
 Amargosa
 Ben Bolt
 Coyote Acres
 K-Bar Ranch
 Loma Linda East
 Owl Ranch
 Rancho Alegre
 Sandia
 South La Paloma
 Westdale

Unincorporated communities

 Bentonville
 Casa Blanca
 La Gloria
 Palito Blanco
 Rancho de la Parita
 Springfield

Education
School districts in the county include:
 Agua Dulce Independent School District
 Alice Independent School District
 Ben Bolt-Palito Blanco Independent School District
 La Gloria Independent School District
 Orange Grove Independent School District
 Premont Independent School District
 San Diego Independent School District

Coastal Bend College (formerly Bee County College) is the designated community college for the county.

See also

 List of museums in South Texas
 National Register of Historic Places listings in Jim Wells County, Texas
 Recorded Texas Historic Landmarks in Jim Wells County

References

External links
 Jim Wells County in Handbook of Texas Online at the University of Texas

 
1911 establishments in Texas
Populated places established in 1911
Majority-minority counties in Texas
Hispanic and Latino American culture in Texas